Ostrer is a surname. Notable people with the surname include:

Harry Ostrer, American geneticist
James Ostrer (born 1979), British photographer
Maurice Ostrer (1896–1975), British film executive
Pamela Ostrer (1916–1996), English actress, author, and screenwriter